Charles McMahon (May 10, 1953 – April 29, 1975) and Darwin Lee Judge (February 16, 1956 – April 29, 1975) were the last two United States servicemen killed in Vietnam during the Vietnam War. The two men, both U.S. Marines, were killed in a rocket attack one day before the Fall of Saigon.

Charles McMahon, 11 days short of his 22nd birthday, was a Corporal from Woburn, Massachusetts. Darwin Judge was a 19-year-old Lance Corporal and Eagle Scout from Marshalltown, Iowa.

Deaths
McMahon and Judge were members of the Marine Security Guard (MSG) Battalion at the US Embassy, Saigon and were providing security for the DAO Compound, adjacent to Tân Sơn Nhứt Airport, Saigon. McMahon had arrived in Saigon on 18 April, while Judge had arrived in early March. Both died in a North Vietnamese rocket attack on Tân Sơn Nhứt on the morning of April 29, 1975.

In accordance with procedures for deceased Americans in Vietnam, their bodies were transferred to the Saigon Adventist Hospital, near Tan Son Nhut. In telephone calls to the hospital on the afternoon of April 29, the few remaining staff advised that the bodies had been evacuated; in fact the bodies were left behind. Operation Frequent Wind, the American evacuation of Saigon, was completed the following day, April 30, 1975. Senator Edward M. Kennedy of Massachusetts, through diplomatic channels, secured the return of the bodies the following year. The transfer of the bodies took place on February 22, 1976, at Tân Sơn Nhứt Airport to two of Kennedy's aides. Their caskets were loaded onto  an Air France Caravelle jet chartered by the United Nations High Commissioner for Refugees and were flown to Bangkok to be received by a U.S. military honor guard and then transferred to U-Tapao Royal Thai Navy Airfield for identification.

Judge was buried with full military honors in March 1976 in Marshalltown, Iowa. There was a flag draped coffin, a Marine Honor Guard, and a rifle firing salute. The flag that covered his coffin was folded and presented to his parents. His funeral was so ignored that major and minor media did not attend the event. The lone exception was the Daily Iowan (Iowa City, Iowa). A full set of photographs of the event is available. Due to ignorance of his military funeral in March 1976, Judge was given a second Marine burial honors 25 years later through planning by Douglas Potratz, USMC MSG who served with Judge in Saigon and Ken Locke, boyhood friend and fellow Eagle Scout; retired USMC Lieutenant Colonel Jim Kean, the commanding officer of the Marines during the Fall of Saigon, presented a flag to Judge's parents at a ceremony held at the Iowa Veteran's Home Vietnam War Memorial.  The Fall of Saigon Marines Association, a California non-profit, public-benefit corporation, was formed to honor the last two Marines to be killed in action in Vietnam. The association sponsors two $500 scholarships for Eagle Scouts attending Marshalltown High School in Marshalltown, Iowa (as a memorial to Eagle Scout Judge).

First and last American casualties in Vietnam
For over 40 years the first American serviceman who died in Vietnam was in controversy. Richard B. Fitzgibbon Jr.'s death in June 1956 was deemed to have taken place before the start of the Vietnam War.  However, the family of Fitzgibbon had long lobbied to have the start date changed and their cause was taken up by U.S. Representative Ed Markey (D-MA). After a high level review by the DoD and through the efforts of Fitzgibbon's family, the start date of the Vietnam war was changed to November 1, 1955. The November 1955 date was chosen as the new start date because that was when the Military Assistance Advisory Group (MAAG) in Vietnam was separated out from "MAAG, Indochina". This was a reorganization of the MAAG into the different countries. With this new date Fitzgibbon became the first person to die in the Vietnam War, Fitzgibbon's name was added to the Vietnam Memorial Wall in 1999. The former first two official casualties were U.S. Army major Dale R. Buis and Master Sergeant Chester Charles Ovnand who were killed on July 8, 1959.

While McMahon and Judge were the last American ground casualties in Vietnam, they are not the last casualties of the Vietnam War (a term which also covers the U.S. involvement in Cambodia and Laos) recorded on the Vietnam Veterans Memorial; those names belong to the 18 Americans killed in the Mayaguez Incident.

See also

Operation Frequent Wind
Vietnam War casualties

References

External links
Fall of Saigon Marine Association
Tribute to McMahon
Tribute to Judge
Marine Embassy Guard Association
Honor Roll
Daily Iowan coverage of Darwin Judge funeral

1953 births
1956 births
1975 deaths
1975 in Vietnam
American military personnel killed in the Vietnam War
Judge, Darwin
People from Marshalltown, Iowa
People from Woburn, Massachusetts
Military personnel from Iowa
Military personnel from Massachusetts
McMahon, Charles
United States Marine Corps personnel of the Vietnam War
Duos